The ZSU-23-4MP "Biała" (pl. White, also the name of more than one small Polish river) is a Polish modification of the ZSU-23-4 Shilka self-propelled anti-aircraft gun. The ZSU-23-4MP "Biała" includes a new digital optical targeting system and 4 Grom surface-to-air missile launcher. The AZP-23 autocannons are equipped with modern ammunition and have an increased effective anti-aircraft range to about 3.5 km, 0.5–1 km more than the original ZSU-23-4. The Grom missiles' maximum range is about 5.5 km.

Around 70 ZSU-23-4MP "Biała" self-propelled anti-aircraft guns are to be produced for the Polish army, as a cheaper alternative to the modern Polish 35 mm PZA Loara self-propelled anti-aircraft gun.

External links
Information on the PZA Loara, ZSU-23-4 Biała, & SA-8 in Polish Army (in Polish, dead link)
Product page at ZMT SA

Armoured fighting vehicles of the post–Cold War period
Self-propelled anti-aircraft weapons
Armoured fighting vehicles of Poland
Science and technology in Poland
23 mm artillery
Self-propelled artillery of Poland